The Tour d'Olmeto is a ruined Genoese tower located in the commune of Monacia-d'Aullène on the west coast of the French island of Corsica. The tower sits on the Punta di Caniscione headland.

The tower was one of a series of coastal defences constructed by the Republic of Genoa between 1530 and 1620 to stem the attacks by Barbary pirates.

References

Towers in Corsica